Mathéo Bodmer (born 6 May 2004) is a French footballer who plays as a midfielder for Ligue 2 club Le Havre.

Career
A youth academy graduate of Le Havre, Bodmer made his professional debut for the club on 15 May 2021 in a 3–2 league win against Troyes.

Bodmer is a current French youth international.

Personal life
Bodmer is son of former professional footballer Mathieu Bodmer.

Career statistics

Club

References

External links
 

2004 births
Living people
Association football midfielders
French footballers
Ligue 2 players
Le Havre AC players